Coenzyme F420-1:γ-L-glutamate ligase (F420:gamma-glutamyl ligase, CofE-AF, MJ0768, CofE) is an enzyme with systematic name L-glutamate:coenzyme F420-1 ligase (GDP-forming). This enzyme catalyses the following chemical reaction

 GTP + coenzyme F420-1 + L-glutamate  GDP + phosphate + coenzyme γ-F420-2

This protein catalyses the successive addition of two glutamate residues to cofactor F420 by two distinct and independent reactions.

References

External links 
 

EC 6.3.2